Alumni Memorial Stadium is a 6,000-seat college football stadium located in Salisbury, North Carolina. The Stadium is home to the Blue Bears of Livingstone College. They compete in the National Collegiate Athletic Association (NCAA) Division II Central Intercollegiate Athletic Association (CIAA).

References

External links
Athletics website

Athletics (track and field) venues in North Carolina
Livingstone Blue Bears football
College football venues
Sports venues in Rowan County, North Carolina
Sports venues in North Carolina
Buildings and structures in Salisbury, North Carolina
American football venues in North Carolina